Kebaowek or Eagle Village First Nation - Kipawa Indian Reserve, is a First Nations reserve in Abitibi-Témiscamingue, Quebec.  It is under the governance of the Kebaowek First Nation.

References

External links
Official site

Indian reserves in Quebec
Communities in Abitibi-Témiscamingue